The 2016 Canoe Slalom World Cup was a series of five races in 5 canoeing and kayaking categories organized by the International Canoe Federation (ICF). It was the 29th edition.

Calendar 

The series opened with World Cup Race 1 in Ivrea, Italy (June 3–5) and concluded with the World Cup Final in Tacen, Slovenia (September 9–11).

Standings 
The winner of each race was awarded 60 points (double points were awarded for the World Cup Final for all the competitors who reached at least the semifinal stage). Points for lower places differed from one category to another. Every participant was guaranteed at least 2 points for participation and 5 points for qualifying for the semifinal run (10 points in the World Cup Final). If two or more athletes or boats were equal on points, the ranking was determined by their positions in the World Cup Final.

Results

World Cup Race 1 

Ivrea, Italy hosted the Canoe Slalom World Cup for the first time. It was also the first time that K1 slalom cross for men and women was an event at a world cup race. No world cup points were awarded for the cross event. The events took place from 3 to 5 June.

World Cup Race 2 

The second race of the series took place at the Segre Olympic Park in La Seu d'Urgell, Spain from 10 to 12 June.

World Cup Race 3 

The third race of the series took place at the Pau-Pyrénées Whitewater Stadium, France from 17 to 19 June.

World Cup Race 4 

The penultimate race of the series took place at the Prague-Troja Canoeing Centre, Czech Republic from 2 to 4 September.

World Cup Final 

Tacen, Slovenia hosted the World Cup Final from 9 to 11 September with double points awarded in each category. During the semifinal run of the men's C1 event a newly built concrete block near the end of the course started to crack. This forced the organizers to shorten the course for the rest of the events. The course only had 14 gates after the change. The jury also allowed the top 15 from the men's C1 semifinal to qualify for the final instead of the top 10 because the crack affected some of the later runners like Nicolas Peschier and Pierre-Antoine Tillard.

See also
 Canoeing at the 2016 Summer Olympics

References

External links 
 International Canoe Federation

Canoe Slalom World Cup
Canoe Slalom World Cup